"Let Me Call You Sweetheart" is a popular song, with music by Leo Friedman and lyrics by Beth Slater Whitson. The song was published in 1910 and was a huge hit for the Peerless Quartet in 1911. A recording by Arthur Clough was very popular the same year too. A 1924 recording identifies a Spanish title, "Déjame llamarte mía".

The song's recording was selected by the Library of Congress as a 2015 addition to the National Recording Registry, which selects recordings annually that are "culturally, historically, or aesthetically significant".

Lyrics
The complete lyrics of the 1911 recording:

Other notable recordings
 Bing Crosby – recorded August 8, 1934 and on July 17, 1944.
 Denny Dennis (1941) – later included in the compilation LP Yours for a Song issued in 1969.
 Joni James – for her album Among My Souvenirs (1958).
 The Mills Brothers – included in their album Greatest Barbershop Hits (1959).
 Pat Boone and Shirley Boone – included in the album Side by Side (1959).
 Patti Page – for her album I've Heard That Song Before (1958).
 Timi Yuro - The title track from the "Let Me Call You Sweetheart" (Liberty Records 7234, 1962) - This recording went to #66 on the US Hot 100, and #15 on the Easy Listening chart.
 Fats Domino - recorded February 15, 1965.
 Slim Whitman – included in his album Red River Valley (1977).
 Valerie Carter and Linda Ronstadt – Barney Reprise

Film and TV appearances
1932 Let Me Call You Sweetheart – Ethel Merman sings the song accompanied by a bouncing ball in a Screen Song produced by Fleischer Studios, featuring Betty Boop and Bimbo
1936 Mickey's Rival – Minnie Mouse hums  it and Mickey whistles it while setting up their picnic, then part of the melody plays in the background at the end of the short
1937 Hearts Are Thumps – Alfalfa (Carl Switzer) sings the song to  Darla Hood in this episode of  The Little Rascals
1937 Make Way for Tomorrow – Victor Moore sings the song with Beulah Bondi, and the film ends with an instrumental rendition plays into the credits
1938 Swiss Miss – sung by Oliver Hardy
1940 Waterloo Bridge
1943 Thousands Cheer – sung by Gene Kelly whilst dancing with a mop
1945 Diamond Horseshoe – performed by Beatrice Kay 
1948 For the Love of Mary
1966 Follow Me, Boys! – sung by a group of Boy Scouts
1975 The Waltons S03E20 – The Shivaree – sung to the Newlyweds by a group headed by Ike
1979 The Rose – sung by Bette Midler
1979 General Hospital Scotty and Laura Wedding – sung by attendees
1982 The Waltons - A Day of Thanks on Walton's Mountain - sung just before the closing credits
1984 Hart to Hart – sung to each other by Robert Wagner and Stefanie Powers at the end of the fifth-season episode entitled "Max's Waltz"
1995 America's Funniest Home Videos - sung by Ken Moore in the winning video Sweetheart Singing Proposal
1998 Barney's Great Adventure – performed by George Hearn
2005 The Greatest Game Ever Played – an instrumental version by a band is heard on the soundtrack
2012 Downton Abbey – sung by Shirley MacLaine
2014 52 Tuesdays – used over the end credits in this Australian film about a transgender father and his daughter Billie
2014 When Calls the Heart – sung by Pascale Hutton in Season 2 Episode 4
2017 Adventure Time – used in Season 9 Elements episode sung by Candy Kingdom characters
2020 Murdoch Mysteries - used in Season 13 Episode 17 "Things Left Behind", sung by the character Dr. Andrew Dixon

See also 
 List of best-selling sheet music

References

External links
Heritage of Harmony barbershop version
Sheet Music for "Let Me Call You Sweetheart", 	Harold Rossiter Music Co., 1910.
 1924 recording  by tenor Lewis James and the International Novelty Orchestra, in the National Jukebox (uses Flash)
1930 cartoon Ethel Merman sings in a Betty Boop cartoon
"Let Me Call You Sweetheart" essay  by David Sager
"Let Me Call You Sweetheart" (1911) on the Library of Congress website.

1910 songs
Songs with lyrics by Beth Slater Whitson
Songs with music by Leo Friedman
United States National Recording Registry recordings